Zeroa is a lamb shank bone or roast chicken wing or neck used on Passover and placed on the Seder plate. It symbolizes the korban Pesach (Pesach sacrifice), a lamb that was offered in the Temple in Jerusalem, then roasted (70 CE) during the destruction of the Temple, the z'roa serves as a visual reminder of the Pesach sacrifice. In Ashkenazi and many Sephardi families, it is not eaten or handled during the Seder, as it represents a sacrifice made at the Temple, but is not actually, making it taboo to eat. Vegetarians often substitute a beet, quoting Pesachim 114b as justification.

References

Passover seder
Passover foods

ja:ゼローア